Oceaniserpentilla haliotis is a Gram-negative and aerobic which has been isolated from the haemolymph serum of the sea snail Haliotis rubra from Tasmania in Australia. Oceaniserpentilla haliotis has the ability to degrade crude oil. It is the only species in the genus Oceaniserpentilla.

References

Oceanospirillales
Bacteria described in 2008